The 2015 NCAA Division II women's soccer tournament will be the 28th annual single-elimination tournament to determine the national champion of NCAA Division II women's collegiate soccer. The semifinals and championship game will be played at Ashton Brosnaham Stadium in Pensacola, Florida from December 3–5, 2015 while the preceding rounds will be played at various sites across the country during November 2015.

Qualification
All Division II women's soccer programs were eligible to qualify for the tournament. The tournament field remained fixed at 48 teams. 22 teams received automatic bids by winning their conference tournaments and an additional 26 teams earned at-large bids based on their regular season records. Teams were placed into one of eight six-team regional brackets based on geographic location.

Automatic qualifiers (22)

At-large qualifiers (26)

Tournament bracket

Southeast and South Regionals

East and Atlantic Regionals

West and South Central Regionals

Central and Midwest Regionals

College Cup

See also 
 NCAA Women's Soccer Championships (Division I, Division III)
 NCAA Men's Soccer Championships (Division I, Division II, Division III)

References

NCAA
NCAA Women's Soccer Championship
NCAA Division II Women's Soccer Tournament